Entomophthoromycota is a division of kingdom fungi. In 2007, it was placed at the taxonomic rank of subphylum in the most recent revision of the entire fungus kingdom. In 2012, it was raised to the rank of phylum as "Entomophthoromycota" in a scientific paper by Richard A. Humber 2012. Divided into three classes and six families (Ancylistaceae, Basidiobolaceae, Completoriaceae, Entomophthoraceae, Meristacraceae, and Neozygitaceae), it contains over 250 species that are mostly arthropod pathogens or soil- and litter-borne saprobes.

Taxonomy
Circumscribed by mycologist Richard Humber in 2012, it contains species formerly classified in the division Zygomycota. Humber's reorganization divides the division into three classes while retaining the previously defined family structure:

Division Entomophthoromycota Humber 2012 [Entomophthoromycotina Humber 2007]
Class Basidiobolomycetes Humber 2012 [Bolomycetes Cavalier-Smith 1998; Bolomycetidae Cavalier-Smith 2012; Basidiobolomycota Doweld 2001]
Order Basidiobolales Jacz. & P.A. Jacz. 1931 ex. Caval.-Sm.
Family Basidiobolaceae Engler & Gilg 1924
Schizangiella Dwyer et al. 2006
Basidiobolus Eidam 1886 [Amphoromorpha Thaxter 1914]
Class Neozygitomycetes Humber 2012
Order Neozygitales Humber 2012
Family Neozygitaceae Ben Ze’ev, Kenneth & Uziel 1987
Apterivorax Keller 2005
Neozygites Witlaczil 1885 [Thaxterosporium Ben Ze'ev & Kenneth 1987]
Class Entomophthoromycetes Humber 2012 [Entomomycetidae Cavalier-Smith 1998 em. 2012]
Order Entomophthorales Winter 1880 [Ancylistales Schröter]
Family Ancylistaceae Schröter 1893
Ancyclistes Pfitzer 1872
Conidiobolus Brefeld 1884 emend. Humber 1989 [Conidiobolus (Capillidium) Ben-Ze’ev & Kenneth 1982; Conidiobolus (Conidiobolus) (Brefeld) Ben-Ze’ev & Kenneth 1982; Conidiobolus (Delacroixia) (Sacc. & Syd.) Tyrrell & MacLeod 1972]
Macrobiotophthora Reukauf 1912 emend. Tucker 1981
Family Completoriaceae Humber 1989
Completoria Lohde 1874
Family Entomophthoraceae Nowakowski 1877 [Empusaceaae]
Subfamily Erynioideae Keller 2005 [Massosporoideae Keller 2005]
Erynia (Nowakowski ex Batko 1966) Remaud. & Hennebert 1980.emend. Humber 1989 [Zoophthora (Erynia) Nowakowski ex Batko 1966]
Eryniopsis Humber 1984 (in part)
Furia (Batko 1966) Humber 2005 [Zoophthora (Furia) Batko 1966; Erynia (Furia) (Batko 1966) Li & Humber 1984]
Orthomyces Steinkraus, Humber & Oliver 1988 
Pandora Humber 2005 [Erynia (Neopandora) Ben-Ze’ev & Kenneth 1982]
Strongwellsea Batko & Weiser 1965 emend. Humber 1976
Zoophthora Batko 1964 emend. Ben-Ze’ev & Kenneth 2005
Subfamily Entomophthoroideae Keller 2005
Batkoa Humber 2005
Entomophaga Batko 1964 emend. Humber 1989
Entomophthora Fresenius 1856 [Empusa (Triplosporium) Thaxter 1888; Triplosporium (Thaxter 1888) Batko 1964]
Eryniopsis Humber 1984 (in part)
Massospora Peck 1879 emend. Soper 1974
Family Meristacraceae Humber 1989
Meristacrum Drechsler 1940 emend. Tucker & Humber 1981 (syn Tabanomyces Couch et al.)

Genera that have an uncertain status or have been excluded from the Entomophthoromycota include Ballocephala, Tarichium, and Zygnemomyces.
Synonyms from "Part 1- Virae, Prokarya, Protists, Fungi". Ballocephala and Zygnemomyces were transferred to Mucoromycota division.

Description
Species in the Entomophthoromycota generally share several characteristics. Their vegetative cells are coenocytic; sporulation occurs by production of forcibly discharged dispersive or infective conidia; and their zygospores (which also function as resting spores) are homothallic.

References

 
Fungus phyla
Fungi by classification
Zygomycota